İpek Derici (born August 19, 1990 in İstanbul, Turkey) is a Turkish female basketball player. The young national plays for Beşiktaş at the forward position.

See also
 Turkish women in sports

References

External links
Beşiktaş Women's Basketball Team 2012-2013

1990 births
Living people
Turkish women's basketball players
North Carolina Tar Heels women's basketball players
Turkish expatriate basketball people
Turkish expatriate basketball people in the United States
Forwards (basketball)